The City Attorney of San Francisco is an elected position in the City and County of San Francisco, California. While city-county consolidation resulted in the unified government attaining both a city attorney and a district attorney, the two positions are separate and serve different purposes.

Whereas District Attorney office is, as is the case throughout the United States, charged with prosecuting crime (i.e. has the equivalent function of a Prosecutor's Office in other legislations), City Attorney provides legal services to the Mayor, Board of Supervisors, and the rest of the city and county administration, examines surety bonds, contracts and ordinances and represents the city and county administration in civil claims, formally as a representative of People of the State of California.

The City Attorney is assisted by a number of Assistant City Attorneys.

History
The present City Attorney position was created in 1899, when the former offices of the City Attorney and County Attorney were unified; Franklin Knight Lane was the first City Attorney elected under this regime.

The first woman to hold the position was Louise Renne in 1986, appointed by then-mayor Dianne Feinstein following the death of previous City Attorney George Agnost.

List of City Attorneys

Prior to 1899 
 Harry T. Creswell (1893–1898)
 Frederick Palmer Tracy

After 1899 
Franklin Knight Lane (1899–1902)
Percy V. Long (1902–1906)
William J. Burke (1906–1908)
Percy V. Long (1908–1916)
George Lull (1916–1926)
John J. O'Toole (1926–1949)
Dion R. Holm (1949–1961)
Thomas Martin O'Connor (1961–1977)
George Agnost (1977–1986)
Philip Ward (1986–1986)
Louise Renne (1986–2001)
Dennis Herrera (2002–2021)
David Chiu (2021–present)

Government of San Francisco
Lawyers from San Francisco
1899 establishments in California